The Seventh Doctor comic stories is a wide range of comic strip adventures featuring the seventh incarnation of The Doctor, the Time Lord protagonist of the hit sci-fi series, Doctor Who.

History
Doctor Who Magazine's Seventh Doctor comic stories began shortly after the broadcast of the Seventh Doctor's first televised story, Time and the Rani. While the cancellation of the television series in 1989 was undoubtedly bad news for Sylvester McCoy's longevity in the role, it was an unexpected boon to the Seventh Doctor's comic life. With no new Doctor on the horizon, the Seventh Doctor lived on in the pages of DWM for years after the transmission of his final televised adventure.
 
In fact, the Seventh Doctor became the first incarnation of the Doctor to be in two regular comic publications simultaneously. Pre-figuring the Tenth Doctor's later "double-duty" in DWM and Doctor Who Adventures, the Seventh Doctor was, briefly, in both DWM and The Incredible Hulk Presents, another Marvel publication.
 
Several different approaches were taken by DWM during this era. At first, they told stories which had no obvious connection to the television series. Frobisher briefly ushered in the new Doctor's era, before scampering off. The Doctor then travelled around either on his own or with one-off companions.
 
After the television series ended, and the Virgin New Adventures series began, there was an effort to try to fit the comic stories into the novels' continuity. This period, though, came to a definitive end when DWM killed off Ace in Ground Zero — an act which deliberately returned DWM to its own, separate continuity.
 
By this stage, however, DWM had taken the editorial decision to consider the Seventh Doctor as a "past" incarnation. They began to use the comic space to tell stories of the other incarnations, which gave modern artists and writers the chance to feature Doctors and companions who hadn't really been a part of the DWM strip before. Thus, though the Seventh Doctor had a much longer reign in comics than television, it was a few years shorter than the gap between Survival and McGann's televised outing.

Comic stories

Doctor Who Magazine

Death's Head

Titan Comics

The Incredible Hulk Presents

See also
 List of Doctor Who comic stories
 First Doctor comic stories
 Second Doctor comic stories
 Third Doctor comic stories
 Fourth Doctor comic strips
 Fifth Doctor comic stories
 Sixth Doctor comic stories
 Eighth Doctor comic stories
 War Doctor comic stories
 Ninth Doctor comic stories
 Tenth Doctor comic stories
 Eleventh Doctor comic stories
 Twelfth Doctor comic stories
 Dalek comic strips, illustrated annuals and graphic novels

Comics based on Doctor Who
Seventh Doctor stories